Slipstream is a song by Australian band Sherbet, released in May 1974 as the second single from Sherbet's third studio album, Slipstream. The song peaked at number 5 on the Kent Music Report.

The song was written by Garth Porter and Clive Shakespeare.

Track listing

Charts

Weekly charts

Year-end charts

Personnel 
 Lead vocals – Daryl Braithwaite
 Bass, vocals – Tony Mitchell
 Keyboards, vocals – Garth Porter
 Drums – Alan Sandow
 Guitar, vocals – Clive Shakespeare

References

Sherbet (band) songs
1974 singles
1974 songs
Festival Records singles
Infinity Records singles
Songs written by Garth Porter
Songs written by Clive Shakespeare